Arthur "Man" Agee Jr. (born October 22, 1972) is a former high school basketball player from Chicago. Agee was one of two Chicago-area basketball players whose lives were chronicled in the 1994 documentary Hoop Dreams.

Early life 
Agee is the second child and first son of Arthur "Bo" Agee Sr. and Sheila Agee. During his younger years, he lived in the north side of Chicago area near where William Gates, the other star of Hoop Dreams, lived. By the time the movie began filming, the Agees had moved to the West Garfield Park neighborhood, which remained Agee's home until his graduation. Upon graduation from grammar school in 1987, he was discovered by part-time, unofficial talent scout Earl Smith, who convinced the Agees to send Arthur to St. Joseph's High School, a private, predominantly white, suburban school.

High school 
In Fall 1987, Agee began his freshman year at St. Joseph High School, the same school that Isiah Thomas, Arthur's childhood hero, attended. Because the school was 90 minutes from his home, Arthur awoke around 5:30 AM daily and took public transportation to reach his destination. Early in his high school career, when his parents were unable to pay the school's tuition payments, Agee left St. Joseph's and attended John Marshall High School, an inner-city school. In his senior year, he helped the Marshall Commandos win the 1991 Public League Championship and finish third for the State Championship. Agee's high school was defeated by Manual High School that was led by future NBA player Howard Nathan.

College and thereafter 
After graduating from Marshall, Agee starred at Mineral Area College and played for two years at Arkansas State on a scholarship. He is a member of Phi Beta Sigma. Although Agee played at a Division I school, he never achieved his dream of playing in the National Basketball Association. In 1996, Agee turned down a contract with the CBA's Connecticut Pride, so that he could take a role in the film Passing Glory with Hoop Dreams director Steve James. In 2004, he launched a Hoop Dreams clothing line with the slogan "Control Your Destiny". On December 15, 2004, his father, Arthur "Bo" Agee Sr., was killed while attempting to run from at least one robber. A Chicago man was charged by Berwyn police, but acquitted of killing Arthur Agee Sr. In 2021, Agee connected with his Hoop Dreams co-star William Gates and producer Matt Hoffar to launch Hoop Dreams The Podcast, in partnership with the Unlearning Network, a Vancouver-based media company.

References

External links
 
 Hoop Dreams The Podcast

1972 births
Living people
Mineral Area College alumni
American male film actors 
African-American basketball players
Arkansas State Red Wolves men's basketball players
Basketball players from Chicago
Junior college men's basketball players in the United States
American men's basketball players
21st-century African-American sportspeople
20th-century African-American sportspeople